The 2017 FIBA U20 European Championship was the 20th edition of the FIBA U20 European Championship. The competition took place in three Greek cities, Chania, Rethymno and Heraklion, on the island of Crete, from 15 to 23 July 2017.

Venues

Participating teams

  (3rd place, 2016 FIBA U20 European Championship Division B)
 

  (Runners-up, 2016 FIBA U20 European Championship Division B)

  (Winners, 2016 FIBA U20 European Championship Division B)

First round
In this round, the 16 teams are allocated in four groups of four teams each. All teams will advance to the Second Round of 16.

Group A

Group B

Group C

Group D

Playoff round

Round of 16

5th–8th place playoffs

9th–16th place playoffs

Final standings

Awards

Most Valuable Player

All-Tournament Team
  Tamir Blatt
  Vassilis Charalampopoulos
  Tryggvi Hlinason
  Antonis Koniaris
  Amine Noua

Statistical leaders
In order for players to qualify as statistical leaders for the tournament, they had to play in at least 4 games during the competition.

Points

Rebounds

Assists

Blocks

Steals

Efficiency

References

External links
 FIBA official website

FIBA U20 European Championship
2017–18 in European basketball
2017–18 in Greek basketball
2017 in youth sport
International youth basketball competitions hosted by Greece
Sport in Heraklion
July 2017 sports events in Europe